Urbano Santos da Costa Araújo (February 3, 1859 – May 7, 1922) was a Brazilian politician who was Vice President of Brazil from November 15, 1914, to November 14, 1918, under Venceslau Brás. As the seventh vice president of Brazil, he also served as the President of the Senate.

References

1859 births
1922 deaths
20th-century Brazilian people
Vice presidents of Brazil
Presidents of the Federal Senate (Brazil)
People from Maranhão
Coffee with milk politics politicians
Candidates for Vice President of Brazil